Avksenty is a Russian Christian male first name. The name is derived from the Greek name Auxentios, which in turn derives from the word auxanō, meaning to increase, to grow. "Avksenty" continued to be a form used by the Russian Orthodox Church, having replaced an earlier form Auksenty.

Its colloquial variants are Aksyon, Aksenty, Oksenty, and Oksyon. The substandard colloquial form Akenty is also used.

The diminutives of "Avksenty" are Avksentyushka, Avksyuta, Ksyuta, Avksyusha, Ksyusha, Ksenya, Ksena, Senya, Aksyonka, Ksyona, Aksentyushka, Aksya, Aksyuta, and Aksyusha.

The patronymics derived from "Avksenty" are "" (Avksentiyevich), "" (Avksentyevich; both masculine); and "" (Avksentiyevna), "" (Avksentyevna; both feminine).

People with this first name
Avksenty Stadnitsky, secular name of Metropolitan Arsenius (1862–1936), Russian orthodox prelate
Avksenty Tsagareli (1857–1902), Georgian playwright

References

Notes

Sources
[1] А. В. Суперанская (A. V. Superanskaya). "Современный словарь личных имён: Сравнение. Происхождение. Написание" (Modern Dictionary of First Names: Comparison. Origins. Spelling). Айрис-пресс. Москва, 2005. 
[2] А. В. Суперанская (A. V. Superanskaya). "Словарь русских имён" (Dictionary of Russian Names). Издательство Эксмо. Москва, 2005. 
Н. А. Петровский (N. A. Petrovsky). "Словарь русских личных имён" (Dictionary of Russian First Names). ООО Издательство "АСТ". Москва, 2005. 

